The United States Department of Justice Antitrust Division is a division of the U.S. Department of Justice that enforces U.S. antitrust law. It has exclusive jurisdiction over U.S. federal criminal antitrust prosecutions. It also has concurrent jurisdiction over civil antitrust enforcement, although it shares civil antitrust enforcement jurisdiction with the Federal Trade Commission (FTC). The Antitrust Division often works jointly with the FTC to provide regulatory guidance to businesses. 

The Division is headed by an Assistant Attorney General, who is appointed by the President of the United States with and by the advice and consent of the Senate, and reports to the Associate Attorney General. The current Assistant Attorney General for the Antitrust Division is Jonathan Kanter, who was sworn into office November 16, 2021.

History
On February 25, 1903, Congress earmarked $500,000 for antitrust enforcement. On March 3, 1903, Congress created the position of Antitrust AG, with a salary to be paid out of the funds earmarked for antitrust enforcement. The 1904 DOJ Register identified two professional staffers responsible for enforcement of antitrust laws, but it wasn't until 1919 that the Division was formally established. 

Attorney General A. Mitchell Palmer “effected the first important reorganization" of DOJ since it was first established in 1870. Palmer organized DOJ into divisions, and placed the AtAG “in charge of the Anti-Trust Division.” Palmer's annual report for the fiscal year ending June 30, 1919 contained the first public statement that DOJ had a component called the "Antitrust Division."

2013 closure of field offices 
The closure of four of the Antitrust Division's criminal antitrust offices in January 2013 generated significant controversy within the Division and among members of Congress.  The Attorney General posited that the closure of these offices will save money and not negatively affect criminal enforcement.  

A significant number of career prosecutors have voiced contrary opinions, noting that the elimination of half of the Division's criminal enforcement offices will increase travel expenses and diminish the likelihood of uncovering local or regional conspiracies.

Leadership 
The head of the Antitrust Division is the Assistant Attorney General for Antitrust (AAG-AT) appointed by the President of the United States. Jonathan Kanter was confirmed as Assistant Attorney General on November 16, 2021.

The Assistant Attorney General is assisted by six Deputy Assistant Attorneys General (DAAG) who each oversee a different branch of the Division. One of the DAAGs holds the position of "Principal Deputy," that is "first among equals," and "will typically assume the powers of the Assistant Attorney General in the Assistant Attorney General's absence."

Front Office and Operations

Office of the Assistant Attorney General 
 Assistant Attorney General
 Deputy Assistant Attorneys General
 Chief of Staff and Senior Advisors
 Directors of Enforcement
 Office of the Chief Legal Advisor

Office of Operations

Civil Sections 
 Civil Conduct Task Force
Defense, Industrials, and Aerospace Section
Financial Services, Fintech, and Banking Section
 Healthcare and Consumer Products Section
 Media, Entertainment, and Communications Section
 Technology and Digital Platforms Section
 Transportation, Energy, and Agriculture Section

Criminal Sections and Offices 
 Chicago Office
 New York Office
 Procurement Collusion Strike Force
 San Francisco Office
 Washington Criminal I Section
 Washington Criminal II Section

Economic Sections 
 Economic Analysis Group

Other Offices 
 Appellate Section
 Competition Policy and Advocacy Section
 Executive Office
 International Section

See also
Competition Bureau (Canadian counterpart)
Competition policy
Competition regulator
Federal Trade Commission
United States v. Microsoft Corp.

References

External links
 Official homepage of the Antitrust Division
 About the Antitrust Division – Mission, History, Sections and Offices

Competition regulators
Antitrust Division
United States antitrust law
Consumer organizations in the United States
 
Antitrust